Hiram Gene Slottow (1921–1989) was a professor of electrical engineering at the University of Illinois at Urbana–Champaign. He was the co-inventor of the plasma display.

After completing his bachelor's degree in physics from the University of Chicago, he completed MS in electrical engineering from the Johns Hopkins University and PhD in electrical engineering from the University of Illinois at Urbana–Champaign. He was a professor of electrical engineering at Illinois from 1968 to 1986. He was also employed as an electrical engineer at the Coordinated Science Laboratory and the Computer-Based Education Research Laboratory from 1968 to 1986.

He won the 2003 Emmy Award in Technical Achievement for the invention of the plasma display. In 2013, he was inducted into the National Inventors Hall of Fame.

References

1921 births
1989 deaths
American electrical engineers
Computer-based Education Research Laboratory
Emmy Award winners
Johns Hopkins University alumni
University of Chicago alumni
Grainger College of Engineering alumni
University of Illinois Urbana-Champaign faculty
20th-century American engineers
20th-century American inventors